Bennur is a village in Dharwad district of Karnataka, India.

Demographics 
As of the 2011 Census of India there were 120 households in Dundur and a total population of 490 consisting of 232 males and 258 females. There were 53 children ages 0-6.

References

Villages in Dharwad district